Pilosocereus chrysacanthus is a species of Pilosocereus found in Mexico to Honduras

References

External links

Flora of Mexico
Flora of Guatemala
Flora of Honduras
chrysacanthus